Beher (Arabic/Persian/Urdu: بحر) in Urdu poetry is the meter of a sher (couplet). Essentially, beher is a specific pattern, combining the arkaans (dummy meaningless words) of Urdu prosody that define the "length" of a sher. However, generally beher is categorized in three classes: Short, medium, long, depending upon the length of the sher of the ghazal.

For a ghazal, since all the shers in it should be of the same beher, determining the beher of one sher (or even one line of the sher) is enough to determine the beher of the entire ghazal. For example, in this ghazal of Ghalib, the length and meter of the ashaar is same throughout. In terms of the European method of scansion, the metre can be written as follows (where "x" = long or short, "u" = short, "–" = long, "u u" = one long or two short syllables):

x u – – u – u – u u –

koii ummiid bar nahiin aatii
koii suurat nazar nahiin aatii 

aage aatii thii haal-e-dil pe hansii 
ab kisii baat par nahiin aatii 

jaanataa huun savaab-e-taa'at-o-zahad
par tabiiyat idhar nahiin aatii 

hai kuchh aisii hii baat jo chup huun
varna kyaa baat kar nahiin aatii 

kaabaa kis muunh se jaaoge 'Ghaalib'''sharm tumako magar nahiin aatiiThe ghazal above is written in a beher called: khafiif musaddas makhbuun mahzuuf maqtu (Meter G8). This is a ten-syllable beher and by the standards of Urdu poetry, is a chotii (small) beher.

As with the scansion of Persian poetry, a syllable such as miid or baat consisting of a long vowel plus consonant, or sharm consisting of a short vowel and two consonants, is "overlong", and counts as a long syllable + a short one.

In Urdu prosody, unlike Persian, any final long vowel can be shortened as the metre requires, for example, in the word kaabaa in the last verse above.

 Mufa_e_lan 
There exist many behers, but mainly there are 19 behers used in Urdu poetry. These behers are further distributed in different types, but they are not described here. The names are:

 beHr-e-rajaz
 beHr-e-ramal
 beHr-e-baseet 
 beHr-e-taweel 
 beHr-e-kaamil
 beHr-e-mutadaarik
 beHr-e-hazaj 
 beHr-e-mushaakil 
 beHr-e-madeed 
 beHr-e-mutaqaarib 
 beHr-e-mujtas 
 beHr-e-muZaara
 beHr-e-munsareH 
 beHr-e-waafer 
 beHr-e-qareeb 
 beHr-e-saree 
 beHr-e-khafeef 
 beHr-e-jadeed 
 beHr-e-muqtaZeb

 Example 
مفاعیلن	مفاعیلن	مفاعیلن

زندہ تھی  کبھی توحید جن کے  دلوں میں 
      وہی لوگ آج باہم بُغض رکھتے ہیں
کرکے رائیگاں زندگی کس  طلب میں  اپنی 
     کیوں یہ ہاتھ آج دھرے  بیٹھے ہیں
  
 
جیسے سہانی ہوتی ہے خوشبوگلاب میں 

    ویسے ہی تیراذکرہے میری کتاب میں

    ماناکہ چاند حسن میں ضرب المثال ہے

    اس سے بھی تم حسین ہو میرے حساب میں

References

Bibliography
Deo, Ashwini; Kiparsky, Paul (2011). "Poetries in Contact: Arabic, Persian, and Urdu". In Maria-Kristina Lotman and Mihhail Lotman ed. Proceedings of International Conference on Frontiers in Comparative Metrics, Estonia, pp. 147–173.
 Pritchett, Frances W. (1993). "Orient Pearls Unstrung: The Quest for Unity in the Ghazal". Edebiyât'' vol. NS 4, pp. 119–135.

Thiesen, Finn (1982). A Manual of Classical Persian Prosody, with chapters on Urdu, Karakhanidic and Ottoman prosody. Wiesbaden.

Urdu-language poetry
Indian poetics
Ghazal
Poetic rhythm